Wellesley Street may refer to:

 Wellesley Street, Toronto, Ontario, Canada
 Wellesley Street, Auckland, New Zealand
 a street in the London Borough of Croydon; see Wellesley Road tram stop